IPL Trailblazers were an Indian cricket team. They were founded in 2018 to compete in the Women's T20 Challenge, which they competed in until the tournament ended in 2022. They won the tournament once, beating Supernovas in the final of the 2020 Women's T20 Challenge by 16 runs.

History

2018
Trailblazers were formed in 2018 to take part in the inaugural Women's T20 Challenge competition, in which they played a one-off match against Supernovas. The game was viewed as a response to the men's Indian Premier League, and hopes were that the one-off game would lead towards a fully-fledged tournament in the future. Indian batter Smriti Mandhana was named as captain of the side, alongside fellow Indians Deepti Sharma and Jhulan Goswami as well as overseas players Alyssa Healy, Suzie Bates, Beth Mooney, Danielle Hazell and Lea Tahuhu. 

In the match, which took place on 22 May 2018, the Trailblazers were put into bat and restricted to 129/6, with Suzie Bates top-scoring for 32. The game went to the final over, with Bates needing to defend four runs. Supernovas batter Ellyse Perry hit a single off the final ball to crown her side champions. The Supernovas were therefore crowned the winners of the inaugural Women's T20 Challenge.

2019
2019 saw the expansion of the tournament to three teams, with the addition of Velocity. Each side played each other once in a group stage, with the top two progressing to a final. Trailblazers won their first game of the tournament, a rematch against Supernovas, after captain Mandhana struck 90 off 67 balls, and tight bowling from Sophie Ecclestone and Rajeshwari Gayakwad restricted the Supernovas batters. In their second match, against Velocity, Trailblazers scored 112/6 batting first, which Velocity chased down with two overs to spare. The group ended with all sides on two points, but the Trailblazers had the worst Net Run Rate and were therefore eliminated.

2020
The 2020 Women's T20 Challenge was delayed due to the COVID-19 pandemic, eventually getting underway in November. Trailblazers played Velocity in their first game, bowling them out for just 47, with overseas bowler Sophie Ecclestone taking 4 wickets for 9 runs. Trailblazers then chased their target down in 7.5 overs. Their second game was much closer, however, as Supernovas set them 146 to chase. Deepti Sharma scored 43*, but Trailblazers fell two runs short.

Trailblazers still qualified for the final on Net Run Rate, however, and faced Supernovas again. Batting first, Mandhana scored 68 as her side reached 118, and tight bowling from Goswami, Sharma and Salma Khatun in particular meant Supernovas could only score 102, giving the Trailblazers their maiden T20 Challenge title.

2022
In 2022, Trailblazers lost their first game of the tournament, against Supernovas, by 49 runs. In their second match, against Velocity, Trailblazers scored 190/5 batting first, with Sabbhineni Meghana and Jemimah Rodrigues scoring half-centuries. Velocity were restricted to 174/9 in reply, but the group ended with all sides on two points, with the Trailblazers on the worst Net Run Rate, therefore being eliminated from the tournament.

The 2022 season proved to be the final edition of the Women's T20 Challenge, with the tournament being replaced by the Women's Premier League from the 2023 season.

Players
Final squad, 2022 season.  
 No. denotes the player's squad number, as worn on the back of their shirt.
  denotes players with international caps.

Overseas players

Seasons

Women's T20 Challenge

Statistics

Women's T20 Challenge

References

Women's T20 Challenge teams